Port Bainbridge is an inland seaport operated by the Georgia Ports Authority and is located in Bainbridge, Georgia. It handles sea trade and cargo shipments to and from the Gulf of Mexico via Florida's Apalachicola River. The terminal facilities cover  and include 9,292 square meters of warehouse space. 

Transportation in Decatur County, Georgia
Buildings and structures in Decatur County, Georgia
Bainbridge